The 1998 Trophée des Champions was a football match held at Stade de la Vallée du Cher, Tours on 30 July 1998, that saw 1998 Coupe de France winners Paris Saint-Germain F.C. defeat 1997–98 Division 1 champions RC Lens 1–0.

Match details

See also
1998–99 French Division 1

1998–99 in French football
1998
RC Lens matches
Paris Saint-Germain F.C. matches
July 1998 sports events in Europe
Sport in Tours, France